Clarence Public School is a public school in the Bangalore South taluk of Bangalore, Karnataka, India.

External links
Clarence Public School

Schools in Bangalore